Colin Roach was a 21-year-old black British man who died from a gunshot wound inside the entrance of Stoke Newington police station, in the London Borough of Hackney, on 12 January 1983. Amid allegations of a police cover-up, the case became a cause célèbre for civil rights campaigners and black community groups in the United Kingdom. Prior to Roach's death, Hackney Black People's Association had been calling for a public inquiry into policing in the area, alleging that there existed a culture of police brutality, wrongful detention of black people, racial harassment, and racially motivated "stopping and searching." Ernie Roberts, the MP for Hackney North and Stoke Newington, said that there had been "a complete breakdown of faith and credibility in the police" in the area and the Commission for Racial Equality called for a full inquiry into both the death of Roach and the policing in Hackney generally. In June 1983 a coroner's jury returned a majority verdict of suicide. INQUEST, the United Kingdom pressure group founded following the death of Blair Peach at the hands of a police officer in April 1979, was highly critical of the coroner's directions to the jury, and said that he had wrongly pointed them towards a verdict of suicide.

Discrepancies
The police surgeon called in after Roach's death observed an inconsistency between the position of Colin Roach's body and suicide. Roach's hand was found to be uninjured, even though when the trigger of a shotgun is pulled facing oneself, the recoil damages and often even breaks the thumb used to pull the trigger. This recoil should also propel the shotgun across the room into a wall, but in Roach's case the gun and the police cell's wall saw no mark of such an impact. However, a gun being forced into Roach's mouth should have left marks, which were not found.

Roach had had a sports bag with him when he entered the cell. However, the shotgun used for the suicide could not have fitted into the bag, even if dissassembled, and the driver who took Roach to the police station said that he didn't see a bulge in Roach's bag. Additionally, no oil from the gun could be found on the bag, nor fibres from the bag on the gun.

The driver claimed that when he dropped off Roach, Roach was frightened. The driver saw him walk into the police station. Irregularities were found in the records with regards to the officers present. Two police officers initially believed to have been present for Roach's arrest later claimed they had not been there.

Roach's death spurred protests and demands for an independent public inquiry. Such an inquiry did not take place, although police did conduct an inquest into the incident. The verdict of the inquest was that he had committed suicide.

The Roach Family Support Committee commissioned its own Independent Committee of Inquiry, which published the book Policing In Hackney: 1945-1984 in 1989.

In popular culture
In August 1983 The Special AKA reached number 60 in the charts with "Racist Friend" / "Bright Lights". The latter song features lyrics that mention Roach:
"I got down to London and what did I see? One thousand policemen all over the street, The people were shouting and looking at me, They say 'the Colin Roach family demand an enquiry'".

The 1990 album by Sinéad O'Connor, I Do Not Want What I Haven't Got, featured a track called "Black Boys on Mopeds". Although the lyrics do not mention Colin Roach directly, the entire album is essentially dedicated to his family, and contains a photograph on the inner sleeve of his sad-faced parents standing in the rain in front of a poster of their son. Below the image is the inscription: "God's place is the world; but the world is not God's place."
 
Benjamin Zephaniah composed a poem entitled "Who Killed Colin Roach?" Roach's death is also mentioned in a track by the Ragga Twins entitled "The Iron Lady". The lyrics to "License Fi Kill" by Linton Kwesi Johnson asks the question "You can't ask Colin Roach if he really shot himself".

Roach's death, and that of Altab Ali, provide context for Joe Thomas' 2023 crime novel White Riot.

The Colin Roach Centre, a community centre, was set up in Hackney to commemorate the death.

References

External links
 Documentation of calls for a public inquiry into the death, archived at the Wayback Machine
 News coverage of the subsequent demonstration

Year of birth missing
1983 deaths
Black British history
Deaths by firearm in London

Deaths by person in London
1983 in London
History of the London Borough of Hackney
Stoke Newington
History of the Metropolitan Police